Brown Township is one of the twelve townships of Vinton County, Ohio, United States.  The 2010 census found 293 people in the township.

Geography
Located in the northeastern corner of the county, it borders the following townships:
Starr Township, Hocking County: north
York Township, Athens County: northeast corner
Waterloo Township, Athens County: east
Knox Township: southeast
Madison Township: south
Vinton Township: southwest corner
Swan Township: west
Washington Township, Hocking County: northwest

No municipalities are located in Brown Township, although the unincorporated communities of Ingham, Moonville, and New Plymouth lie in the township's southeast, southeast, and northwest respectively.

Name and history
It is one of eight Brown Townships statewide.

Government
The township is governed by a three-member board of trustees, who are elected in November of odd-numbered years to a four-year term beginning on the following January 1. Two are elected in the year after the presidential election and one is elected in the year before it. There is also an elected township fiscal officer, who serves a four-year term beginning on April 1 of the year after the election, which is held in November of the year before the presidential election. Vacancies in the fiscal officership or on the board of trustees are filled by the remaining trustees.

References

External links
Vinton County Chamber of Commerce 

Townships in Vinton County, Ohio
Townships in Ohio